The 1879–80 Scottish Cup – officially the Scottish Football Association Challenge Cup – was the seventh season of Scotland's most prestigious football knockout competition. With 142 entrants, this season saw the largest number of teams to compete for the trophy since its inception. Three-time defending champions Vale of Leven lost their first match in the competition for four seasons when they were knocked out in the first round, losing 4–3 to rivals Dumbarton. Queen's Park regained the trophy as they won the competition for the fourth time after beating Thornliebank 3–0 in the final on 21 February 1880.

Format

As with the previous competitions, the seventh edition of the Scottish Cup took on the format of a traditional knockout tournament. For the earlier rounds, the names of competing teams were placed into lots according to their districts and drawn into pairs. The home team for each tie was determined by the toss of a coin unless it was mutually agreed or only one of the two clubs drawn against one another had a private ground. In the event of a draw, the team who lost the toss would have the choice of ground for the replay. A similar procedure was used for subsequent rounds however, any club which had received a bye in the previous round would first be drawn against one of the winners of the previous round. The names of winning teams were placed into one lot for later rounds. The choice of venue for the final matches was reserved to the Scottish Football Association.

Calendar

Both Glasgow and Edinburgh University were given byes to the third round.
Two teams qualified for the second round after drawing their first round replay.
Two teams qualified for the third round after drawing their second round replay.
Four teams qualified for the fifth round after drawing their fourth round replay.
Star of Leven and Kirkintilloch Athletic were reinstated in the second round and Lennox in the third round after Jamestown were disqualified.

Teams
Of the 143 entrants, 135 entered the competition in the first round. The remaining eight sides – namely Barrhead Rangers, Bellshill, Cartside, Dennistoun, High School, Plains Bluebell, Stewarton Cunninghame and Strathmore – were admitted into the competition in the second round.

First round
Although 142 teams were entered in the competition, it was not uncommon for clubs to merge or fold without the Scottish Football Association being notified so they were still included in the draw for the cup. As a result, 25 teams were given walkovers into the second round. They joined Kirkintilloch Athletic, St Clement's and Tarbolton Burntonians who received a bye to the second round. Glasgow University and Edinburgh University received a bye to the third round.

The first round got underway on 6 September 1879 when Beith drew with Kilbirnie. Both teams would advance to the second round after they drew their replay on 27 September and the Scottish Football Association decided to allow them both into the draw. The majority of the ties were played two weeks later. Defending champions Vale of Leven were handed a tough draw away to rivals Dumbarton. It would be the first time the defending champions failed to make it past the first hurdle as a brace from Joseph Lindsay helped Dumbarton to a 4–3 win in their first competitive match at Boghead Park. Queen's Park and Rangers played out a goalless draw in front of 7,000 spectators at Kinning Park to set up a replay a week later while Kilmarnock Athletic defeated Ayr 6–0, Thornliebank won 4–0 at home to Yoker, Netherlee and Morton drew 0–0 and Renton were held to a 2–2 draw by Kilmarnock Thistle. In the replays on 27 September, Queen's Park exacted revenge for the previous season's defeat as they trounced Rangers 5–1 at Hampden Park, Morton and Netherlee shared 11 goals as the former advanced 7–4 at Cappielow and Renton recorded the biggest win of the round, defeating Kilmarnock Thistle 8–0 away from home.

Jamestown had defeated Star of Leven 2–1 on 20 September but would later be disqualified from the competition after the referee for their second round match against Kirkintilloch Athletic was found to be a member of the club. Star of Leven would be reinstated in the second round to play Kirkintilloch Athletic. The round concluded when Campsie Glen defeated Thistle Athletic 4–0 on 4 October after they had been ordered to replay the original match, which Campsie Glen also won, two weeks earlier.

Matches

Glasgow and Suburbs

Dunbartonshire district

Lanarkshire district

Edinburgh and East

Ayrshire district

Renfrewshire district

Stirlingshire district

Perthshire district

Forfarshire district

Dumfriesshire district

Wigtownshire district

Replays

Glasgow and Suburbs

Dunbartonshire district

Ayrshire district

Renfrewshire district

Stirlingshire district

Notes

Sources:

Second round
A further two sides scratched from the competition as Cumnock and Strathmore were given a walkover against Tarbolton Burntonians and St Clement's respectively while Arbroath, Parkgrove and Renfrew received a bye to the third round.

The second round began on 4 October 1879 with Kilmarnock Athletic's 1–1 draw with Kilbirnie, however, most ties were played a week later. Queen's Park marched through to the third round with a resounding 14–1 win over 1st Lanark RV while there were also big wins for South Western (9–0 vs. Athole), Dumbarton (7–0 vs. Helensburgh) and Hurlford (8–1 vs. Maybole Carrick). Morton again shared 11 goals, this time with Arthurlie, but they were on the receiving end this time as the Barrhead side won 8–3 while Thornliebank won 6–1 at home to 17th Renfrew RV. Heart of Midlothian were ordered to replay their tie with Brunswick after the original match, a 4–2 win on 18 October, was ended in darkness. It made little difference as Hearts won 2–1 two days later.

The second round originally concluded on 1 November 1879 when 3rd Lanark RV overcame Possil Bluebell 1–0 in a replay, however that was before Jamestown's disqualification. Jamestown had defeated Kirkintilloch Athletic 1–0 but, after their third round tie, it was discovered that the referee in that win had been a member of the club. As a result, but Kirkintilloch Athletic and Jamestown's first round opponents, Star of Leven, were reinstated to the competition to face off in the second round. Kirkintilloch Athletic won that match 5–2 on 15 November and they took on Jamestown's third round opponents Lennox in the next round.

Matches

Replays

Notes

Sources:

Third round
Possilpark were the lucky club to receive the only bye to the fourth round. The third round began on 1 November 1879 with a clutch of ties, included amongst them; Dumbarton's 5–0 win over Renton, Queen's Park's 5–1 triumph against Partick, Thornliebank's 1–0 defeat of Barrhead Rangers and Parkgrove's first match in the competition after they benefitted from a walkover and a bye in the previous rounds, a 6–2 defeat of Alexandra Athletic. Jamestown also recorded a 5–1 win against Lennox but it was to be the end of the road for the Dunbartonshire side. After it was discovered the referee in their second round match with Kirkintilloch Athletic was a member of the club, Jamestown were disqualified and the three teams they had eliminated were reinstated. Kirkintilloch Athletic defeated Star of Leven in a second round tie on 15 November to set up the final third round tie on 22 November against Lennox, a match Kirkintilloch Athletic won 6–2.

In the interim, Hamilton Academical defeated Excelsior 7–1 at South Haugh, Cumnock – one of three teams along with Parkgrove and Strathmore to reach the third round without playing a single game – lost 1–0 to Hurlford, Arbroath and Clyde recorded 6–1 wins against Strathmore and Ailsa respectively and Hibernian won 2–1 in the Edinburgh derby.

Matches

Replay

Sources:

Fourth round
The fourth round saw a number of one-sided games. On 22 November 1879, three teams recorded double-figures scorelines; Dumbarton won 11–0 at home to Clyde, Queen's Park defeated Strathblane 10–1 at Hampden Park and Thornliebank won 12–0 at home to Possilpark. Hibernian drew 2–2 with Parkgrove and Kilbirnie drew 1–1 with Hurlford to set up replays the following week but all four sides advanced to the fifth round after both replays ended with the scored tied.

Matches

Replays

Notes

Sources:

Fifth round
3rd Lanark RV were the only team to receive a bye to the quarter-finals. All six of the fifth round ties were played on 20 December 1879 with one tie going to a reply the following week. Queen's Park recorded the biggest win of the competition as they defeated Hurlford 15–1 at Hampden Park. Thornliebank also recorded a double-figures as they beat Rob Roy 12–0 at home. A double from Quinn helped Hibernian to a 2–0 win at Connell Park against Mauchline while Dumbarton beat Kilbirnie 6–2 at Boghead Park. South Western and Parkgrove couldn't be separated as they drew 1–1 in the first match before South Western progressed with a 3–2 win in the replay.

Matches

Replay

Sources:

Quarter-finals
With just seven teams left, there were only three quarter-final ties and Queen's Park received a bye to the semi-finals. The original ties were played on 3 January 1880 with one replay a week later. Dumbarton and Pollokshields Athletic recorded comfortable home wins, 6–2 vs. Hibernian and 6–1 vs. South Western respectively. Thornliebank and 3rd Lanark RV played out a 1–1 draw at the Renfrewshire side's Deacon's Bank ground before Thornliebank won the replay 2–1 at the ground of South Western as Cathkin Park was being used for international trial matches.

Matches

Replay

Sources:

Semi-finals
For the first time in four seasons, two semi-finals were played. Both games were played on 17 January 1880. Queen's Park saw off Dumbarton 1–0 at Hampden Park to reach the final for the first time in four years while Thornliebank defeated Pollokshields Athletic 2–1 at home to reach the final for the first time.

Matches

Sources:

Final

The final took place at Cathkin Park on 21 February 1880. It was Thornliebank's first appearance in the final but for Queen's Park, it was their fourth and on each of their previous three appearances, they lifted the trophy. Thomas Highet – who scored three goals in the 1876 final and replay, the last time Queen's Park won the competition – scored twice against Thornliebank to help Queen's Park to a 3–0 win and a fourth title, maintaining their 100 per cent record in Scottish Cup finals.

See also
1879–80 in Scottish football

References

1879–80
Cup
Scot